Ancistrus bolivianus is a species of catfish in the family Loricariidae. It is native to South America, where it occurs in the basins of the Beni River, the Mamoré River, and the Madre de Dios River. The species reaches 8.8 cm (3.5 inches) SL.

References 

bolivianus
Fish described in 1915
Freshwater fish of Brazil
Fish of Bolivia